Rizwan Saeed (born 14 March 1978) is a Pakistani first-class cricketer who played for Karachi cricket team.

References

External links
 

1978 births
Living people
Pakistani cricketers
Karachi cricketers
Defence Housing Authority cricketers
Cricketers from Karachi